Jerzy Turek (17 January 1934 – 14 February 2010) was a Polish actor and performer.  Turek was born on 17 January 1934 in the eastern village of Tchórzowa.  He died on 14 February 2010 in Warsaw at the age of 76.

Selected filmography
 Kwiecień (1961)
 I Hate Mondays (1971)
 Calls Controlled (1991)

External links

Jerzy Turek obituary  

1934 births
2010 deaths
Male actors from Warsaw
Polish male film actors
Polish male stage actors
People from Węgrów County
Recipients of the Order of Polonia Restituta